The Imboulou Dam is a dam on the Léfini River, near Ngabé, Ngabe District, Pool Department, Republic of the Congo, about 300 kilometers north of Brazzaville. It was inaugurated by President Denis Sassou-Nguesso on the 7 May 2011.

References 

Dams completed in 2011
Energy infrastructure completed in 2011
Dams in the Republic of the Congo
Hydroelectric power stations in the Republic of the Congo
Roller-compacted concrete dams